is a Japanese football player. He plays for Azul Claro Numazu.

Playing career
Masayuki Tokutake played for Zweigen Kanazawa from 2014 to 2015. In 2016, he moved to Azul Claro Numazu.

Club statistics
Updated to 14 April 2020.

References

External links
Profile at Azul Claro Numazu

1991 births
Living people
Tokoha University alumni
Association football people from Tokyo Metropolis
People from Kodaira, Tokyo
Japanese footballers
J2 League players
J3 League players
Japan Football League players
Zweigen Kanazawa players
Azul Claro Numazu players
Association football defenders